Bad Nauheim is a town in the Wetteraukreis district of Hesse state of Germany.

As of 2020, Bad Nauheim has a population of 32,493. It is a world-famous resort, noted for its salt springs, which are used to treat heart and nerve diseases. A Nauheim or "effervescent" bath, named after Bad Nauheim, is a type of spa bath through which carbon dioxide is bubbled.<ref name="Kellog1908">{{cite book | title=The Battle Creek Sanitarium System. History, Organisation, Methods |url=https://archive.org/details/battlecreeksani00kellgoog| last= Kellogg| first= J.H., M.D., Superintendent| year=1908 | publisher=Battle Creek| location= Michigan| pages=79,81,83,170,175,187|access-date=2009-10-30}} Full text at Internet Archive (archive.org)</ref> This bath was one of several types of hydrotherapy used at Battle Creek Sanitarium and it was also used at Maurice bathhouse, in Bathhouse Row in the early 1900s, during the heyday of hydrotherapy. The Konitzky Foundation, a charitable foundation and hospital for those without means, was founded in 1896 and its building occupies a central place next to the Kurpark.

History
Before the Holocaust there was an on-and-off Jewish presence in Bad Nauheim since around 1303. Before the Holocaust nearly 400 Jews lived in the town, making up nearly 3% of the population. On Kristallnacht the schoolhouse was desecrated and ransacked as well as Jewish stores, businesses and the synagogue. Many Jews were taken that night to concentration camps. Some were let out. Of those let out many were rearrested. By the end of the Holocaust there were just three Jews remaining in Bad Nauheim. For the most part those who were not murdered had left the country.

On September 29, 1945 General Dwight D. Eisenhower reassigned General Patton from his beloved 3rd Army, the army he successfully led from the Battle of Normandy, to Czechoslovakia as Eisenhower could no longer keep General Patton in position as the Military Governor of Bavaria. General Patton was assigned to command the Fifteenth Army, actually a group of historians given status as an Army, with its headquarters in Bad Nauheim.  On December 9, 1945, General Patton left Bad Nauheim for a hunting trip near Mannheim; he died after a car crash during the trip.

The Grand Hotel in Bad Nauheim was also the location of the Gestapo-led internment of around 115 Americans who were working in the U.S. Embassy in Berlin, December 1941. The group would leave Bad Nauheim on May 12, 1942.

In addition, during World War II Adolf Hitler had a command complex in nearby Langenhain-Ziegenberg called Adlerhorst, "the Eagle's Nest" (not to be confused with Kehlsteinhaus of Obersalzberg, which was never referred to as "the Eagle's Nest" by the Nazis).

On March 29, 1945, Bad Nauheim was occupied by troops from the Third Army. It was used as a residential area for American occupation forces after World War II. Despite its proximity to Frankfurt am Main and Hitler's command complex, Bad Nauheim was totally spared from Allied bombing. American occupants from that time were told that President Roosevelt had loved the town so much from his days there that he ordered it spared.

Elvis Presley lived in Bad Nauheim from 1958 to 1960 while in the U.S. Army. At the time, he was assigned to the 1st Medium Tank Battalion, 32d Armor, 3d Armored Division, at Ray Barracks near Friedberg. Since 2002, Bad Nauheim has hosted an annual Elvis festival.

Other famous people who have stayed in the town include Jamshetji Nusserwanji Tata – founder of Tata Group of Companies (he died in Bad Nauheim on 19 May 1904 aged 82), the Irish novelist and man of letters Patrick Sheehan holidayed at the Hotel Augusta Victoria in Bad Nauheim 6–23 September 1904, Franklin D. Roosevelt (as a boy, FDR had been taken for several extended visits to Bad Nauheim where his father underwent the water cure for his heart condition), the Saudi Arabian football team during the 2006 FIFA World Cup, General George S. Patton, who celebrated his sixtieth birthday in the grand ballroom of the Grand Hotel and Albert Kesselring, Nazi General who died there in 1960.

Education
 Freie Waldorfschule Wetterau
 Ernst-Ludwig-Schule (Gymnasium)
 St. Lioba Gymnasium (Gymnasium)
 Stadtschule an der Wilhelmskirche (Grund- und Hauptschule)
 Stadtschule Am Solgraben (Haupt- und Realschule)

Mayors
 1945–1948: Adolf Bräutigam (SPD)
 1948–1954: Krafft-Helmut Voss (independent)
 1954–1960: Fritz Geißler (FDP)
 1960–1981: Herbert Schäfer (SPD)
 1981–1993: Bernd Rohde (CDU)
 1993–1999: Peter Keller (SPD)
 2000–2005: Bernd Rohde (CDU)
 2005–2011: Bernd Witzel (UWG)
 2011-2017: Armin Häuser (CDU)
 since September 2017: Klaus Kreß (independent)

Popular culture
The novel The Good Soldier by Ford Madox Ford (published 1915) is set in part at Bad Nauheim.

Twin towns – sister cities

Bad Nauheim is twinned with:
 Bad Langensalza, Germany
 Buxton, England, United Kingdom
 Chaumont, France
 Oostkamp, Belgium

The Sprudelhof
The Sprudelhof is recognized as the largest center of Jugendstil within Germany.

Notable residents
 Julian Dudda (born 1993), professional football player.
 Holger Geschwindner (born 1945), basketball player.
 Rainer Philipp (born 1950), ice hockey player.
 Klaus Hentschel (born 1961), physicist and historian of science.
 Caroline Link (born 1964), Director, won the Academy Award for Best Foreign Language Film and Deutscher Filmpreis for Nowhere in Africa'' (2001).
 Elvis Presley (1935–1977), American singer and actor, lived at Goethestrasse 14 from 1958 to 1960 while stationed at Ray Barracks near Friedberg.
 George S. Patton (1885–1945), U.S. Army general, commanded the Fifteenth Army at Bad Nauheim from October  1945 until his death in December.
 Jessica Wahls (born 1977), singer, former member of the girl group No Angels.
 Sina-Valeska Jung (born 1979), actress.

See also 

811 Nauheima

References

External links

  
 

9th-century establishments in the Holy Roman Empire
Holocaust locations in Germany
Populated places established in the 9th century
Spa towns in Germany
Wetteraukreis